Vârfu Câmpului is a commune in Botoșani County, Western Moldavia, Romania. It is composed of six villages: Dobrinăuți-Hapăi, Ionășeni, Lunca, Maghera, Pustoaia and Vârfu Câmpului.

Natives
 Emil Bobu
 Alexandru Zub

External links 
 Vârfu Câmpului history and geography

References

Communes in Botoșani County
Localities in Western Moldavia